Dragi Zmijanac (born 25 February 1960 in Skopje) is a Macedonian social worker, humanitarian and children's rights activist.

Biography 
Zmijanac was born in Skopje on 25 February 1960. In April 1992, he founded Megjashi, the first children's embassy in the world, which promotes and protects children's rights as well as provides support for child victims of violence and abuse.

References 

Macedonian human rights activists
1960 births
Living people
People from Skopje